MCAD may refer to:

Science and technology
 ACADM or MCAD, a gene
 Medium-chain acyl-CoA dehydrogenase, an enzyme used in lipid metabolism
 Medium-chain acyl-coenzyme A dehydrogenase deficiency (MCAD deficiency or MCADD), caused by mutations in the ACADM gene
 Mast cell activation disorder, a disease
 Microsoft Certified Application Developer
 Mechanical computer-aided design

Organizations
 Massachusetts Commission Against Discrimination, US
 Minneapolis College of Art and Design, US